The Washington Lions were a professional ice hockey team based in Washington, D.C. They were founded as a member of the American Hockey League in the 1941–42 season. The Lions played for two seasons and then disbanded during World War II. Another Washington Lions team played in the Eastern Hockey League from 1944–47. The AHL Lions were resurrected in 1947. Following the 1948–49 season, the team was relocated to Cincinnati, Ohio as the Cincinnati Mohawks. The void was filled by a second team of the same name playing in the Eastern Hockey League, from 1951–53, and 1954–57, who later became the Washington Presidents, when purchased by Harry Glynne III, and Jerry DeLise.

American Hockey League results

Regular season

Playoffs

Eastern Hockey League results

Regular season

Playoffs

The team made the playoffs in 1952–1953 season but lost in the first round.

References

Defunct American Hockey League teams
Sports in Washington, D.C.
Eastern Hockey League teams
Defunct ice hockey teams in the United States
1941 establishments in Washington, D.C.
1943 disestablishments in Washington, D.C.
1947 establishments in Washington, D.C.
1949 disestablishments in Washington, D.C.